Oswaldo Antonio Mairena (born July 30, 1975 in Chinandega, Nicaragua) is a former Major League Baseball relief pitcher for the Chicago Cubs and Florida Marlins.

Biography
Mairena represented Nicaragua at the 1995 Pan American Games and the 1996 Summer Olympics. Immediately after his performance in the Olympics, he was signed by the New York Yankees as an amateur free agent. He began pitching in the Yankees organization in 1997 with the Greensboro Bats. He was promoted in 1998 to the Tampa Yankees, and promoted again to the Norwich Navigators in 1999, where he finished the season with a 4–3 win–loss record and a 2.67 earned run average (ERA) in 43 games. He spent the first half of 2000 with Norwich until July 21, when he was traded with Ben Ford to the Chicago Cubs for Glenallen Hill. After spending August in the minor leagues, Mairena was promoted to the Cubs' major league roster. He made his debut on September 5, and finished the season with an 18.00 ERA in two games.

In 2001, Mairena was traded during spring training to the Florida Marlins for Manny Aybar, and split the season between the Calgary Cannons and Portland Sea Dogs. In 2002, he spent the first half of the season with Calgary until his promotion to the major league roster. He pitched in 31 games for the Marlins and had a 2–3 record and an ERA of 5.35. He spent all of 2003 with the Triple-A Albuquerque Isotopes, pitching in 61 games for the team. Mairena was released from the team after 2003, and spent 2004 with the Uni-President Lions of the Chinese Professional Baseball League. He spent 2005 in the Mexican League, splitting the season between the Guerreros de Oaxaca and Vaqueros Laguna, and ended his professional career representing Nicaragua at the 2005 Baseball World Cup and the 2007 Pan American Games.

References

External links

1975 births
Living people
Albuquerque Isotopes players
Baseball players at the 1995 Pan American Games
Baseball players at the 1996 Summer Olympics
Baseball players at the 2007 Pan American Games
Calgary Cannons players
Chicago Cubs players
Columbus Clippers players
Diablos Rojos del México players
Expatriate baseball players in Canada
Florida Marlins players
Greensboro Bats players
Guerreros de Oaxaca players
Gulf Coast Marlins players
Iowa Cubs players
Major League Baseball pitchers
Major League Baseball players from Nicaragua
Mexican League baseball pitchers
Nicaraguan expatriate baseball players in Mexico
Nicaraguan expatriate baseball players in the United States
Nicaraguan expatriate sportspeople in Canada
Norwich Navigators players
Olympic baseball players of Nicaragua
Pan American Games bronze medalists for Nicaragua
Pan American Games medalists in baseball
Pan American Games silver medalists for Nicaragua
People from Chinandega
Portland Sea Dogs players
Tampa Yankees players
West Tennessee Diamond Jaxx players
Vaqueros Laguna players
Medalists at the 1995 Pan American Games
Expatriate baseball players in Taiwan
Uni-President Lions players